The Ghosts of Yesterday is a 1918 American silent adventure drama film directed by Charles Miller and starring Norma Talmadge, Eugene O'Brien, and Stuart Holmes. It is based on the play Two Women by Rupert Hughes.

Plot

Cast
 Norma Talmadge as Ruth Graham / Jeanne La Fleur
 Eugene O'Brien as Howard Marston
 Stuart Holmes as Count Pascal de Fondras
 John Daly Murphy as Duc de Lissac
 Henry Hebert as Roger Stearns (credited as Henry J. Hebert)
 Ida Darling as Mrs. Whitaker
 Blanche Douglas as Marie Calleaux

Preservation status
The film survives incomplete in the Library of Congress, which holds reels 1-4 of 6 and a fragment of the last reel.

References

External links
 
 

1918 films
American silent feature films
American black-and-white films
Films based on works by Rupert Hughes
Films directed by Charles Miller
American adventure drama films
1910s adventure drama films
Selznick Pictures films
1918 drama films
1910s American films
Silent American drama films
Silent adventure drama films
1910s English-language films